Rufford Comprehensive School (later just The Rufford School) was a secondary school in the village of Edwinstowe in Nottinghamshire, England which opened its doors in September 1976 and closed in 2003.

References

Defunct schools in Nottinghamshire
Educational institutions established in 1976
1976 establishments in England
Educational institutions disestablished in 2003
2003 disestablishments in England
Edwinstowe